Kızıleniş is a village in the Refahiye District of Erzincan Province in Turkey. The village is nestled in between mountains and is known for the many herds of sheep.

References

Villages in Refahiye District